John Luis Shaw (1870–1952) was a Seventh-day Adventist missionary, educator, and treasurer. He graduated from the scientific course at Battle Creek College (now Andrews University) in 1893 and became dean of men at Union College. In 1897 he became principal of Claremont Union College in South Africa. In 1901 he was ordained and sent to India, where he oversaw the establishment of the Watchman Press in 1903 and was in charge of the field from 1901 to 1912. He returned to the United States because of poor health in 1912 and was appointed principal of the Washington Foreign Mission Seminary. From 1913 to 1915 he was secretary of the General Conference Department of Education. From 1922 to 1936 he was treasurer of the General Conference. During his retirement he served for a time as board chair of Loma Linda University.

See also
 History of the Seventh-day Adventist Church
 Seventh-day Adventist Church
 Seventh-day Adventist theology
 Seventh-day Adventist eschatology
 Teachings of Ellen White
 Inspiration of Ellen White
 Prophecy in the Seventh-day Adventist Church
 Investigative judgment
 The Pillars of Adventism
 Second Advent
 Baptism by Immersion
 Conditional Immortality
 Historicism
 Three Angels' Messages
 End times
 Sabbath in Seventh-day Adventism
 Ellen G. White
 Adventist
 Seventh-day Adventist Church Pioneers
 Seventh-day Adventist worship

References 

1870 births
1952 deaths
Seventh-day Adventist religious workers
Ellen G. White Estate
Andrews University alumni
American Seventh-day Adventist missionaries
Seventh-day Adventist missionaries in India
Seventh-day Adventist missionaries in South Africa